Prince William is a civil parish in York County, New Brunswick, Canada.

For governance purposes it forms the local service district of the parish of Prince William, which is a member of Regional Service Commission 11 (RSC11).

Origin of name
The parish is named in honour of Prince William, patron of the King's American Dragoons who settled the area.

History
Prince William was erected in 1786 as one of the county's original parishes. It extended as far inland as the rear line of Kingsclear Parish, which was twelve miles from the Saint John River, and well as any islands in front of it in the river.

In 1833 the western part of Prince William was included in the newly erected Dumfries Parish.

In 1847 four islands were transferred to Queensbury Parish. Little Coac, Big Coac, and Great Bear all appear on the cadastral map of the area; Bloodworth appears as Heustis Island, which was granted to N. Bloodworth.

In 1855 an interior area was included in the newly erected Manners Sutton Parish.

In 1895 the rear of Prince William was included in the newly erected McAdam Parish.

In 1973 all reference to islands in the Saint John River was removed. The islands were flooded by the Mactaquac Dam.

Boundaries
Prince William Parish is bounded:

 on the northeast by the Saint John River;
 on the southeast by the southeastern line of a grant to Francis Horsman at Wheeler Cove and its prolongation southeasterly about 9.2 kilometres to a line running north 45º west, the prolongation of the southwestern line of a grant to James Taylor on the western side of Route 640, then along the prolongation to Lake George, then running southwesterly parallel to the Sunbury County line about 27.7 kilometres to strike the McAdam Parish line about 1 kilometre south of Route 4 and 2.9 kilometres southwest of its junction with Diffen Road;
 on the southwest by the eastern lines of several large grants to the New Brunswick Railway Company and New Brunswick and Canada Railway and Land Company east of McAdam;
 on the west by the prolongation of a grant line on the Saint John River about 300 metres upriver of Rosborough Settlement Road, part of a six-lot grant to St. Clement's Church in Dumfries, then running northeasterly along the prolongation to the river, beginning at a point west of Magaguadavic Lake.

Communities
Communities at least partly within the parish.

 Blaney Ridge
 Donnelly Settlement
  Lake George
 Lake Road
 Lower Prince William
  Magaguadavic
 Magaguadavic Siding
  Magundy
 Pokiok Settlement
  Prince William
 Rosborough Settlement
 Upper Prince William

Bodies of water
Bodies of water at least partly within the parish.

  Saint John River
 Coac Reach
 Scoodawakscook Bend
 Magundy Stream
 Pokiok Stream
 Jewetts Creek
 Joslin Creek
 Dry Lake
  Lake George
 Magaguadavic Lake
 Mink Lake
 Waterloo Lake

Islands
Islands at least partly within the parish.
 Bodkin Island
 Butterfly Island
 Cedar Islands
 Long Island
 Nova Scotia Island

Other notable places
Parks, historic sites, and other noteworthy places at least partly within the parish.
 Kings Landing Historical Settlement
 Kings Landing Wildlife Management Area

Demographics

Population
Population trend

Language
Mother tongue (2016)

See also
List of parishes in New Brunswick

Notes

References

Local service districts of York County, New Brunswick
Parishes of York County, New Brunswick